Josiomorpha penetrata is a moth of the subfamily Arctiinae first described by Francis Walker in 1865. It is found from southern Mexico to Guatemala.

References

Moths described in 1865
Arctiinae